A referendum on allowing King Leopold III's return to Belgium, and restoration of his powers and duties as monarch was held in Belgium on 12 March 1950. The proposal was approved by 57.68% of voters.

Background

King Leopold went into exile in June 1944, when Heinrich Himmler ordered him to leave Belgium. Leopold was held by the Nazis in Strobl, Austria until early May 1945, when he was freed by members of the United States 106th Cavalry Group. Because of the political troubles surrounding his war time behaviour, King Leopold remained in exile in Switzerland until 1950, his brother Prince Charles, Count of Flanders having been installed as Regent after the Liberation in 1944.

The Catholics, who generally supported the King's return, won a majority in the Belgian Senate during the general election of 26 June 1949. The Catholics formed a government with the Liberals. The date of the referendum (Consultation populaire) the King wanted was set by this government for 12 March 1950.

Socialist Leader Paul-Henri Spaak opposed holding a referendum. He foresaw that the vote for Leopold might fall between 55% and 65%, giving no decisive mandate for the king's return, and that the King would carry Flanders and lose Wallonia. In that case, said Spaak, "the government would not only have on its hands the King's abdication or return, it would also have to appease the anger, acerbity and rancor of Flanders or Wallonia."

Results

The question voters were asked was:
Dutch: "Zijt U de mening toegedaan dat Koning Leopold III de uitoefening van zijn grondwettelijke machten zou hernemen?"
French: "Êtes-vous d'avis que le Roi Leopold III reprenne l'exercice de ses pouvoirs constitutionnels ?"
Translation: "Are you of the opinion that King Leopold III should resume the exercise of his constitutional powers?"

A majority voted in favour of Leopold's return. In Flanders, 72% voted in favour. In Wallonia, 58% voted against. In Brussels, 52% voted against.

By arrondissement

Aftermath

References

M
1950 in Belgium
Belgium
Referendums in Belgium
1950 referendums
Monarchy referendums
March 1950 events in Europe